Ravanica is a Serbian Orthodox monastery on Kučaj mountains near Ćuprija in Central Serbia. 

Ravanica may also refer to:
 Vrdnik-Ravanica Monastery, a Serb Orthodox monastery in Vrdnik in the Fruška Gora mountains in the northern Serbia, in the province of Vojvodina
 Ravanica (Kraljevo),  a village in Kraljevo municipality in Serbia

See also
Ravnica (disambiguation)
Ravašnica